Corsican football club SC Bastia finished the 2010–11 season as champions of the French Championnat National and was promoted to Ligue 2. The club's top scorer of the season was David Suarez with 23 goals in 20 league matches. SC Bastia reached the 7th round of the Coupe de France and the last 16 of the Coupe de la Ligue. In May 2010, prior to the season, manager Faruk Hadžibegić was replaced by Frédéric Hantz.

Season overview 
SC Bastia had run up an operating deficit of €1.2 million in the previous financial year. On 15 June 2010, following a review of each club's administrative and financial accounts in the Championnat National, the Direction Nationale du Contrôle de Gestion (DNCG) ruled that Bastia and Gueugnon would be relegated to the Championnat de France amateur. Both Bastia and Gueugnon had the option to appeal the decision. On 25 June 2010, the Corsican Assembly and the General Council of Haute-Corse approved grants of €800,000 and €150,000 to be given to Bastia in order for the club to meet the DNCG's financial requirements, which would allow the club to remain in the Championnat National. However, on 6 July, the DNCG remained firm on its stance relegating the club to the fourth division after questioning the legitimacy of the grants and the sale of the club's training center. Bastia president, Julien Lolli, remained confident that the club would play in the Championnat National and issued an appeal to the CNOSF, the National Sporting Committee of France, the same day. On 2 July, the DNCG announced that Gueugnon would remain in National after the club successfully appealed to the organisation. On 16 July, the CNOSF ruled against the DNCG and announced that Bastia should play in the Championnat National. The club's place in the league was confirmed upon the release of the league table.

On 15 June, Bastia announced the signing of Jérémy Choplin and Gaël Angoula on free transfers, from Rodez and Pacy Vallée-d'Eure respectively. Christophe Gaffory left the club for Vannes for a transfer fee of €50,000.

Bastia exited the Coupe de la Ligue in the round of 16, losing 4–0 to Auxerre on 27 October. During the match, fans used pyrotechnics and threw objects onto the pitch. According to the LFP's disciplinary committee, Bastia club officials hindered the arrest of the guilty individuals while an Auxerre steward sustained injuries. As a result of these incidents the disciplinary committee excluded Bastia from the following year's edition of the league cup in December.

Transfers

In

Out

Squad and statistics 

|-
|colspan="14"|Playing half a season at the club:

|}

Friendly matches

Competitions

Championnat National

League table

Results summary

Results by round

Matches 
Note: 9. and 29. weeks did not match.

Source: Foot-National.com, Retrieved on 11 March 2012.

Coupe de France

Coupe de la Ligue

References 

SC Bastia seasons
Bastia